Gluconacetobacter sacchari is a species of acetic acid bacteria first isolated from the leaf sheath of sugar cane and from the pink sugar-cane mealy bug (Saccharicoccus sacchari) on sugar cane growing in Queensland and northern New South Wales. The type strain of this species is strain SRI 1794T (=DSM 12717T). It is notable for its production of bacterial cellulose and for being an endophyte in sugar cane.

References

Further reading

External links

Type strain of Gluconacetobacter sacchari at BacDive -  the Bacterial Diversity Metadatabase

Rhodospirillales
Bacteria described in 1999